Rhizophagus irregularis (previously known as Glomus intraradices) is an arbuscular mycorrhizal fungus used as a soil inoculant in agriculture and horticulture. Rhizophagus irregularis is also commonly used in scientific studies of the effects of arbuscular mycorrhizal fungi on plant and soil improvement. Until 2001, the species was known and widely marketed as Glomus intraradices, but molecular analysis of ribosomal DNA led to the reclassification of all arbuscular fungi from Zygomycota phylum to the Glomeromycota phylum.

Description

Spores
Color - white, cream, yellow-brown 
Shape - elliptical with irregularities 
Size - generally between 40 - 140 μm

Hyphae
Shape - Cylindrical or slightly flared  
Size - Width: 11 - 18 μm

Identification 
Rhizophagus irregularis colonization peaks earlier than many of the other fungi in Rhizophagus. There tends to be extensive hyphal networking and intense intraradical spores associated with older roots of host plants.

At times the spores are densely clustered or patchily distributed, depending on the host species. When the spores are heavily clustered, mycorrhizologists and others will tend to mistake G. intraradices for G. fasciculatum.

Reproduction 
Rhizophagus irregularis (previously known as Glomus intraradices) has been found to colonise new plants by means of spores, hyphae or fragments of roots colonized by the fungus

Ecology and distribution

Distribution 
Rhizophagus irregularis can be found in almost all soils, especially those populated with common host plants and in forests and grasslands.

This is a brief list of some common host plants.  Most agricultural crops will benefit from Rhizophagus irregularis inoculation. Generally host plants must be vascular plants, but not always.

Onion - Allium cepa L.
Soapbush Wattle - Acacia holosericea
Flax - Linum usitatissimum L.
Cowpea - Vigna unguiculata 
Tomato Plant - Lycopersicon esculentum 
Albaida - Anthyllis cytisoides

Conservation and status 
Rhizophagus irregularis is not of conservation concern; however, individual populations could be harmed by agricultural chemicals and tillage.

Relevance 
In numerous scientific studies R. irregularis has been shown to increase phosphorus uptake in multiple plants as well as improve soil aggregation due to hyphae.

Because of these qualities, R. irregularis is commonly found in mycorrhizal based fertilizers.

In a recent study, R. irregularis was found to be the only arbuscular mycorrhizal fungi that was able to control nutrient uptake amounts by individual hyphae depending on differing phosphorus levels in the surrounding soil.

References

External links 

 JGI Mycorrhizal Genomics Initiative on Rhizophagus irregularis DAOM 181602 v1.0

Soil biology
Glomerales
Fungi described in 1982